The 1984–85 season was the 39th season in FK Partizan's existence. This article shows player statistics and matches that the club played during the 1984–85 season.

Friendlies

Competitions

Yugoslav First League

Matches

Yugoslav Cup

UEFA Cup

First round

Second round

Third round

See also
 List of FK Partizan seasons

References

External links
 Official website
 Partizanopedia 1984-85  (in Serbian)

FK Partizan seasons
Partizan